Bobby Ray Parks Sr. (November 26, 1961 – March 30, 2013) was an American professional basketball player from Grand Junction, Tennessee. He played for Memphis State University (now the University of Memphis) from 1980-1984 and played internationally in the Philippines, Indonesia and France. As one of the most celebrated "import" players in the Philippine Basketball Association (PBA), Parks became the second American ever inducted into the PBA Hall of Fame in 2009.

College career
Bobby Parks came to Memphis State University in the fall of 1980 under head coach Dana Kirk. Over the next four seasons he helped the Tigers to an 86–34 record, two Metro Conference Championships and three appearances in the NCAA Tournament. He appeared in 27 games as a freshman and totaled 238 points.

During his second season with the Tigers, 1981–82, Parks upped his scoring average to 11.4 points per game in leading the team to a 24–5 record. As a junior, Parks received All-America honors from The Sporting News after scoring 488 points and helping his team to an NCAA Midwest Region invitation. He capped his Memphis career by again averaging in double figures in scoring and finished his senior season with a Sweet 16 appearance in the NCAA Tournament. Parks is now ranked 15th in his alma mater's career scoring with 1,266 points.

Professional career

Continental Basketball Association
Parks was chosen in the third round by the Atlanta Hawks in the 1984 NBA Draft, the 58th player of 228 chosen in the draft. Wearing his trademark no. 22, Parks played for the Hawks in the NBA pre-season but was cut before the regular campaign started.  He also played parts of four seasons in the Continental Basketball Association, appearing in 83 games for the Pensacola Tornados, Mississippi Jets, Rockford Lightning and Rochester Renegade between 1985 and 1994.

Philippines
Parks began a career overseas in France in 1986 and in 1987, then played in the Philippines where he would become a legend. He made his PBA debut with San Miguel Beer in 1987. He saw action the following year for Formula Shell until 1999. He finished his 12-year PBA career with nearly 9,000 points, over 3,000 rebounds and more than 1,000 assists in 220 games.  In 1989 alone, he averaged 52.6 points in 23 games with a high of 72.  Parks won a PBA record of seven Best Import awards and led his teams (San Miguel and Shell) to three PBA championships. While in the Philippines, Parks also appeared in several Filipino movies.

Indonesia
After his PBA stint, Parks went to Indonesia to play for Aspac Jakarta in the Kobatama (Kompetisi Bola Basket Utama) competition. Parks, called by Indonesian fans as 'The Ice Man' or 'Uncle Bob,' suited up as import for the Indonesian club teams in the Seaba tournament and Asian Basketball Confederation (now FIBA-Asia) Champions Cup. Parks involved in bringing Aspac to final since 1994 and dedicated two titles in 1995 and 1996. Parks sweetly closed his stint in Indonesia in 1997, when Aspac defeated Indonesia Muda with 112-99. Parks makes 12-times of 3-point shots to break the previous record by Pelita Jaya's Aprijadi with 10-times of 3-point shots at previous match.

Coaching record

PBA

Retirement 
He returned to Memphis in 2005, partly to finish his degree under the invitation of coach John Calipari and the athletic department. Another motivation for the move was to bring his son Bobby Jr. (also known as "Ray Ray"), a promising teenage player, to Memphis to expose him to better basketball competition. Parks also served as the personal assistant to John Paul "Jack" Jones, a wealthy University of Virginia alumnus from Memphis who is the namesake for UVA's current basketball arena.

On June 2, 2010, Parks and his family moved back to the Philippines. Parks accepted a position as athletics director at National University in Manila. During that time, he was in the middle of a battle with laryngeal cancer; his treatment was reported to be successful in April 2011. In November 2010, Bobby Jr. signed a letter of intent to play basketball at Georgia Tech, but then disappeared from the view of both Tech and the American media for several months. Eventually, Luke Winn of Sports Illustrated tracked the younger Parks down, discovering in April 2011 that Bobby Jr. had enrolled at NU and was expected to lead the Bulldogs in the upcoming UAAP season.

In 2011, the San Miguel Beermen (ABL) joined the ASEAN Basketball League and named Parks its first head coach. He led the team to a finals appearance, losing to the Indonesia Warriors.

Death
On March 30, 2013 (Black Saturday), Parks died after a long battle with lung cancer, which developed from his previously untreated laryngeal cancer.

Legacy

To commemorate Parks' legacy, the PBA renamed the prestigious "PBA Best Import of the Conference Award" to the "Bobby Parks PBA Best Import of the Conference Award". The award was renamed on March 31, 2013, a day after Parks' death, as it coincided with the scheduled awarding during the 2013 PBA Commissioner's Cup.  The first recipient of the renamed award was Robert Dozier of the Alaska Aces—coincidentally, also a former Memphis player.

Parks became the second American and the first import ever inducted into the PBA Hall of Fame on October 9, 2009.

Parks was inducted into the University of Memphis' M Club Hall of Fame on September 10, 2004.

References

1961 births
2013 deaths
American expatriate basketball people in France
American expatriate basketball people in the Philippines
Atlanta Hawks draft picks
ASEAN Basketball League coaches
Basketball players from Tennessee
Deaths from lung cancer in the Philippines
Deaths from laryngeal cancer
Memphis Tigers men's basketball players
Mississippi Jets players
Pensacola Tornados (1985–86) players
People from Grand Junction, Tennessee
Philippine Basketball Association All-Stars
Philippine Basketball Association imports
Rochester Renegade players
Rockford Lightning players
San Miguel Beermen players
Shell Turbo Chargers players
American men's basketball players
Guards (basketball)
United States Basketball League players